In geometry, an icositrigon (or icosikaitrigon) or 23-gon is a 23-sided polygon. The icositrigon has the distinction of being the smallest regular polygon that is not neusis constructible.

Regular icositrigon
A regular icositrigon is represented by Schläfli symbol {23}.

The regular icositrigon is not constructible with a compass and straightedge or angle trisection, on account of the number 23 being neither a Fermat nor Pierpont prime. In addition, the regular icositrigon is the smallest regular polygon that is not constructible even with neusis.

Concerning the nonconstructability of the regular icositrigon, A. Baragar (2002) showed it is not possible to construct a regular 23-gon using only a compass and twice-notched straightedge by demonstrating that every point constructible with said method lies in a tower of fields over  such that , being a sequence of nested fields in which the degree of the extension at each step is 2, 3, 5, or 6.

straightedge. Then  belongs to a field  that lies in a tower of fields

for which the index  at each step is 2, 3, 5, or 6. In particular, if , then the only primes dividing  are 2, 3, and 5. (Theorem 5.1)

If we can construct the regular p-gon, then we can construct , which is the root of an irreducible polynomial of degree .

This result establishes, considering prime-power regular polygons below the 100-gon, that it is impossible to construct the 23-, 29-, 43-, 47-, 49-, 53-, 59-, 67-, 71-, 79-, 83-, and 89-gons with neusis. But it is not strong enough to decide the cases of the 11-, 25-, 31-, 41-, and 61-gons. Elliot Benjamin and Chip Snyder discovered in 2014 that the regular hendecagon (11-gon) is neusis constructible; the remaining cases are still open.

An icositrigon is not origami constructible either, because 23 is not a Pierpont prime, nor a power of two or three. It can be constructed using the quadratrix of Hippias, Archimedean spiral, and other auxiliary curves; yet this is true for all regular polygons.

Related figures
Below is a table of ten regular icositrigrams, or star 23-gons, labeled with their respective Schläfli symbol {23/q}, 2 ≤ q ≤ 11.

References

External links
 Automated Detection of Interesting Properties in Regular Polygons

Polygons by the number of sides